The second season of MTV's reality dating series Are You the One? premiered on October 6, 2014. Unlike the previous season, one contestant has two matches, resulting in eleven female but only ten male contestants. Christina is revealed as the first girl of the threeway couple. It is a race between Christina and another to find their perfect match and be confirmed in the "Truth-Booth." The first couple of the threeway-couple to do so would end up in the honeymoon-suite, while the other girl would have to leave empty-handed. However, this only occurred if one of those two matches were confirmed in the "Truth Booth." If neither Christina, nor the other girl are sent home, and the group wins the money by getting 10 matches at the matchup ceremony, then all 21 contestants would win the monetary prize.

Cast

Progress 

Notes

 Unconfirmed Perfect Match  This girl was not chosen in the match-up ceremony

Truth Booths

Episodes

{{Episode table |background=#87D3F8 |overall=5 |season=5 |title=30 |airdate=20 |country= U.S. |viewers=10 |episodes=
{{Episode List
 |EpisodeNumber   = 11
 |EpisodeNumber2  = 1
 |Title           = One Too Many
 |OriginalAirDate = 
 |ShortSummary    = The wild adventure begins with all new singles looking for love and money. The cast gets to know one another, hook-ups happen, relationships form, and an 11th girl is brought on to shake things up. Paris and Pratt try to avoid the Truth Booth by faking a fight with each other, but the other housemates aren't pleased when they find this out. John accidentally fractures Briana's nose, causing her to temporarily be taken out of the game. |Viewers         = 0.71
 |LineColor       = 87D3F8
}}
{{Episode List
 |EpisodeNumber   = 12
 |EpisodeNumber2  = 2
 |Title           = The Truth Will Cost You
 |OriginalAirDate = 
 |ShortSummary    = Relationships continue to form and several couples become convinced that they've found their match. Brandon and Christina stick together, while something personal allows Briana to become closer to Curtis. Layton and Shelby are entangled in love triangles. The guys dig up dirt on the girls. |Viewers         = 0.65
 |LineColor       = 87D3F8
}}
{{Episode List
 |EpisodeNumber   = 13
 |EpisodeNumber2  = 3
 |Title           = Virgin Tears
 |OriginalAirDate = 
 |ShortSummary    = The house can't agree on a strategy. Shelby ends her love triangle, which results in Nate having a meltdown over Shelby. John tries to move in on Christina, but gets blocked by Brandon and Jenni sees a side to Layton that she doesn't like. Tyler continues to struggle making connections with the guys in the house. |Viewers         = 0.63
 |LineColor       = 87D3F8
}}
{{Episode List
 |EpisodeNumber   = 14
 |EpisodeNumber2  = 4
 |Title           = Loose Lips Sink Relationships
 |OriginalAirDate = 
 |ShortSummary    = The house decides to relieve some tension. An alcohol-fueled mistake by Paris threatens her relationship with Pratt. 
Perfect Match #1:  Paris & Pratt |Viewers         = 0.58
 |LineColor       = 87D3F8
}}
{{Episode List
 |EpisodeNumber   = 15
 |EpisodeNumber2  = 5
 |Title           = Strap Those Boots Tight
 |OriginalAirDate = 
 |ShortSummary    = The house is stunned by the last matchup ceremony. With Anthony no longer being an option, Jenni thinks that Layton is her match. Ellie shares her feelings for Anthony, but does not get the reaction she wants. Brandon tries to move on from Christina. Another perfect match is found, which ends up tearing apart one of the closest couples in the house. The house has an argument-filled Matchup Ceremony.
Perfect Match #2:  Shelby & Curtis |Viewers         = 0.68
 |LineColor       = 87D3F8
}}
{{Episode List
 |EpisodeNumber   = 16
 |EpisodeNumber2  = 6
 |Title           = Parental Guidance
 |OriginalAirDate = 
 |ShortSummary    = The ladies get a surprise visit from their parents, who come in to interrogate the guys. Jess and Ellie target Jenni, while tension between Layton and Anthony reaches its boiling point. The house has another failed Matchup Ceremony. |Viewers         = 0.80
 |LineColor       = 87D3F8
}}
{{Episode List
 |EpisodeNumber   = 17
 |EpisodeNumber2  = 7
 |Title           = Hot Salsa
 |OriginalAirDate = 
 |ShortSummary    = After another failed Matchup Ceremony, the house is eager for a fresh start. Ashley finds herself in a potentially explosive love triangle. John believes he finally found his match in Jenni but the house isn't so sure. Brandon continues to make enemies in the house. 
Perfect Match #3:  Jenni & John |Viewers         = 0.65
 |LineColor       = 87D3F8
}}
{{Episode List
 |EpisodeNumber   = 18
 |EpisodeNumber2  = 8
 |Title           = Dumped
 |OriginalAirDate = 
 |ShortSummary    = Dario and Layton's battle over Ashley intensifies. Ellie is interested in Nathan, but Christina and Nathan believe they've found their perfect match in each other. Brandon and Briana get to know each other better. The house has to decide which couple to put into the truth booth. The wrong decision may cost them the game. Christina reaches her breaking point as the pressure of being the 11th girl begins to take its toll. |Viewers         = 0.63
 |LineColor       = 87D3F8
}}
{{Episode List
 |EpisodeNumber   = 19
 |EpisodeNumber2  = 9
 |Title           = Old Flames
 |OriginalAirDate = 
 |ShortSummary    = Despite not being a match, Nathan explodes when Christina returns to Brandon. With just two Matchup Ceremonies left, some newfound connections are made between certain people in the house. Ashley's indecision over Layton and Dario may cost the house the win.
Perfect Match #4:  Jasmine & Alex |Viewers         = 0.70
 |LineColor       = 87D3F8
}}
{{Episode List
 |EpisodeNumber   = 20
 |EpisodeNumber2  = 10
 |Title           = One Switch, One Glitch
 |OriginalAirDate = 
 |ShortSummary    = The rivalry between Dario and Layton comes to an end. Layton tries to figure out whether to make a connection with Tyler or Christina. Ellie and Nathan's heart to heart talk leaves her heartbroken. The house endures a final Matchup Ceremony. With only one switch away from winning the money, Layton makes a shocking decision that ends up putting everybody's game in jeopardy.
Perfect Match #5:  Ashley & Dario |Viewers         = 0.92
 |LineColor       = 87D3F8
}}
}}

After filming 
Nate Siebenmark & Ellie Puckett competed on Are You The One?: Second Chances.

Anthony Bartolette appeared on the third season of the MTV dating show Ex on the Beach.

The Challenge

References

Are You the One?
2014 American television seasons